This is a list containing the Billboard Hot Latin Tracks number-ones of 1998. Due to damage to the Broadcast Data Systems monitors in Puerto Rico caused by Hurricane Georges, no charts were published from October 10 to October 17.

See also
Billboard Hot Latin Tracks

References

1998 record charts
Lists of Billboard Hot Latin Songs number-one songs
1998 in Latin music